Target Goldseven is a 1966 Italian-Spanish Eurospy film  directed by Alberto Leonardi and starring Tony Russel and Erika Blanc. It was shot between Portugal and Rome.

Plot

Cast 

  Tony Russel	as  Alan Milner  
  Erika Blanc	as Erika Brown
  Conrado San Martín	as Otis
  Dyanik Zurakowska	as Mitzi (as Diannyk Zurakowska)
  Fernando Cebrián	as Kare
   Adriano Micantoni as Louis Kerez Fischer (as Peter White)
   Wilbert Bradley as Steiner  
  Antonio Pica as Alex

References

External links

1966 films
Spanish spy thriller films
Italian spy thriller films
1960s spy thriller films
Films scored by Piero Umiliani
1960s Italian films
1960s Spanish films